The 2013 Big Ten Conference men's soccer season was the 23rd season of men's varsity soccer in the conference.

The defending regular season champions, Penn State Nittany Lions successfully defended their title. The Indiana Hoosiers won the 2013 Big Ten Conference Men's Soccer Tournament.

Changes from 2012 
No new teams joined the conference in 2013; however, 2013 was the final season with seven schools competing, as Rutgers and Maryland joined in 2014.

Preseason 
Defending national champion Indiana was picked to win the conference ahead of Michigan State.

Preseason poll

Teams

Stadia and locations 

 Illinois, Iowa, Minnesota, Nebraska and Purdue do not sponsor men's soccer

Personnel

Regular season

Results

Postseason

Big Ten Tournament

NCAA Tournament

Statistics

See also 

 Big Ten Conference
 2013 Big Ten Conference Men's Soccer Tournament
 2013 NCAA Division I men's soccer season
 2013 in American soccer

References 

 
2013 NCAA Division I men's soccer season
2013